This is the list of notable stars in the constellation Lepus, sorted by decreasing brightness.

References

List
Lepus